is a Japanese anime television series, strongly influenced by Shinto, that follows the adventures of teenage goddess Yurie Hitotsubashi and her friends. It was broadcast by the anime television network Animax on its respective networks worldwide, including Japan, East Asia, South Asia, Southeast Asia, where it received its first English-language broadcast.

The series was adapted as a manga serialized in Dengeki Daioh, a shōnen manga magazine, and collected in two tankōbon volumes.

In July 2008, Geneon Entertainment and Funimation announced an agreement to distribute select titles in North America. While Geneon still retained the license, Funimation would assume exclusive rights to the manufacturing, marketing, sales and distribution of select titles. Kamichu! was one of several titles involved in the deal. However, as of August 2011, the rights to the series had expired.

Story
She has no idea what sort of goddess she is or what her powers are. In her journey she meets many other divinities and spirits, and learns the ways of the gods in order to become a great goddess herself. During the course of the series, Yurie grows more in being both a better goddess and as a person.

Kamichu! is set in the Spring of 1983 to the Spring of 1984, in the city of Onomichi, Hiroshima prefecture, on the shores of Japan's Inland Sea. Many of the temples and landmarks shown in the anime are real locations in and around the city, faithfully depicted.

Characters

Yurie is the protagonist of the series. In the first episode, she tells her best friend Mitsue that overnight she has become a goddess; how or why this became so is never further explained. She is remarkably naïve and simple-minded, but always has the best intentions. She has had a crush on Kenji Ninomiya for a long time, and gets very nervous and red-faced around him. Whenever she exercises her divine powers, her hair grows very long and she often falls asleep afterward, due to the taxing effort involved. At the end of the anime she becomes Kenji's girlfriend.

Matsuri is the person in charge of the Raifuku Shrine in Onomichi. She runs the shrine with her sister, Miko, and their widowed father, the chief priest. Matsuri is always thinking of schemes to earn money for the shrine or attract more visitors to the it, usually through exploiting Yurie's newfound divinity. Unlike Miko, she cannot see spirits without the charms that Yurie usually writes (though in the manga and anime, Miko states that Matsuri had been able to see spirits in her childhood). Her name means "worship".

Mitsue is Yurie's bespectacled best friend. She's very down-to-earth, and serves as the "straight man" for her friends, but wishes that her life were more exciting. Yurie often goes to her for advice, which is simple common sense that is always right. She is usually possessed by Yashima when he needs to communicate with people or when he wants to play the guitar.

Miko is Matsuri's shy younger sister. She does the cooking in the house, and is very polite and respectful to everyone. She helps out in the shrine and has the ability to see spirits. She has a crush on the shrine's god, Yashima, whom she often speaks with. Her name, Miko, is also the term for a Shinto shrine attendant.

Kenji is the president and only member of his school's calligraphy club. He is quiet, aloof, and rather slow on the uptake. He loves his brushes, and he often does calligraphy for the Raifuku shrine. He only does calligraphy when he is 'inspired', yet it takes him a while to realise that most of his sources of inspiration revolve around Yurie, who has an intense crush on him. At the end of the anime, he becomes Yurie's boyfriend.

Yashima is the local kami of the Raifuku shrine. He wishes to be a rock star, so he often possesses Mitsue (who is totally against this) in order to fulfil his dream. He is also often seen with an Akita Inu that talks. He seems to be close friends with Miko Saegusa, but it is implied that he is more interested in her sister, Matsuri.

Shoukichi is Yurie's younger brother, who like Miko, attends the same school as his older sister, one grade below. Often, he acts more mature than his sister and often teases her, but he does love her. He has a crush on Miko, and acts differently and blushes whenever he is around her.

A kouhai of Yurie, Matsuri, and Mitsue who is also in love with Kenji.

A male student at Yurie's school who was competing for student council. 

A poverty god Yurie takes in after he saves Tama's life. He shares Tama's body.

Yurie's pet cat. After she began to share her body with Bin-chan, she exhibits a number of human traits which make Shoukichi suspicious.

Yurie and Soukichi's mother.

Yurie and Soukichi's father.
Ino, Shika, Chou
Ino 
Shika 
Chou 
The three tiny spirits that the God Association sends to Yurie as her assistants. Their names are puns, as they were given by Yurie for unrelated reasons but correspond to the animals that they resemble. Chou is a butterfly, Ino is a boar and Shika is a deer. "Ino-Shika-Chou" is also a winning hand in the cards game, Hanafuda.

Media

Anime
There are sixteen episodes in the anime series. Twelve episodes were broadcast on TV Asahi in 720p, omitting episodes 8, 11, 13, and 16. The DVD release included all sixteen episodes. The opening theme was  performed by Maho Tomita, and the closing theme was  performed by MAKO.

On July 3, 2008, Geneon Entertainment and Funimation announced an agreement to distribute select titles in North America. While Geneon Entertainment still retained the license, Funimation would assume exclusive rights to the manufacturing, marketing, sales and distribution of select titles. Kamichu! was one of several titles involved in the deal. However, as of August 2011, the rights to the series had expired.

The titles of several  episodes are from Japanese pop songs from the 1980s and 1990s.

Manga

Kamichu! was adapted as a manga serialized by MediaWorks in Dengeki Daioh, a shōnen manga magazine, and collected in two tankōbon volumes.

There are fourteen episodes plus one short episode in the manga series. Four long episodes consist of two parts (02+03, 04+05, 09+10, 12+13).

Music
Three Kamichu! CDs were released:

 アイスキャンディー Maxi - 2005-08-24 
 晴れのちハレ! Maxi - 2005-08-24 
 Kamichu OST - 2005-10-26

Reception
The anime received an Excellence Prize at the 2005 Japan Media Arts Festival.

See also
Arahitogami: More information on human being as a God(dess) in Shinto religion.

References

External links
 Official Kamichu! website by Sony Music 
 Official Kamichu! website
 Interview with Hideyuki Kurata and Koji Masunari  - about the anime Kamichu!
 

2005 manga
Animax original programming
Anime with original screenplays
Aniplex
Brain's Base
Dengeki Comics
Dengeki Daioh
Fantasy anime and manga
Geneon USA
Hideyuki Kurata
Japanese mythology in anime and manga
MediaWorks (publisher)
Religious comics
School life in anime and manga
Shinto in fiction
Shinto kami in anime and manga
Shōnen manga
Slice of life anime and manga
TV Asahi original programming
Television shows about spirit possession
Yōkai in anime and manga
Iyashikei anime and manga